The 2013 Tre Valli Varesine was the 93rd edition of the Tre Valli Varesine single-day cycling race. It was held on 23 August 2013, over a distance of 199.5 km. The race started with a circuit in Varese, passed through the three "varesine valley" (Valganna, Valcuvia and Valtravaglia) and another circuit in Luino, and ended in Campione d'Italia on the Lago di Lugano.

The race was decided on the final climb: when Bongiorno attacked with two kilometers to go, only Đurasek could follow the young Italian rider. The two managed to keep themselves few seconds ahead of Kolobnev, who was chasing them alone, and the Croatian rider won the two-men sprint to get his first victory for Lampre-Merida.

Teams
15 teams and more than 100 riders took part to the race. Pre-race favourites were Damiano Cunego, Enrico Gasparotto, Fabio Aru, Pierre Rolland, Alexandr Kolobnev and Davide Rebellin.

Results

References

2013 UCI Europe Tour
Tre Valli Varesine
2013 in Italian sport